The 2004 Speedway Grand Prix Qualification or GP Challenge was a series of motorcycle speedway meetings used to determine the 6 riders that would qualify for the 2004 Speedway Grand Prix to join the other 16 riders that finished in the leading positions from the 2003 Speedway Grand Prix.

The system introduced the previous year, that of four quarter finals and two semi finals was retained and only 6 riders would qualify through the GP Challenge.

Piotr Protasiewicz won the GP Challenge.

Format
 First Round (64 riders qualifying from respective national championships)
 Quarter finals - 32 riders to semi finals
 Semi finals - 16 riders to GP Challenge
 Final Round - 6 riders from the GP Challenge to the 2004 Grand Prix

Quarter finals
32 riders to semi finals (Andrea Maida & Jarosław Hampel seeded to sf)

Semi finals
16 riders from to GP Challenge

Final Round

GP Challenge
6 riders to 2004 Grand Prix
17 August 2003  Poole

+broke his leg and was unable to compete further

References 

Speedway Grand Prix Qualification
Speedway Grand Prix Qualifications